Sir Peter Frank Hannibal Emery (27 February 1926 – 9 December 2004) was a British Conservative Party politician.

Early life
Emery was born in London, but was evacuated to the United States during World War II. He was educated at Scotch Plains-Fanwood High School in New Jersey, graduating in 1943, before serving with the Royal Air Force. He attended Oriel College, Oxford. While at Oriel he founded the political group United Europe with Edward Boyle, Peter Kirk, and Dick Taverne. He was librarian of the Oxford Union.

Emery was a councillor on Hornsey Borough Council, chairing the housing committee. He was a school governor and a member of the executive committee of the London Municipal Society.

Parliamentary career
He stood for Parliament without success in Poplar at the 1951 general election and Lincoln. He first gained a seat in parliament at the 1959 general election, when he famously ousted trade unionist Ian Mikardo—of whose union Emery was a member—from his Reading seat. He became a founding member of the Bow Group. In the 1964 general election, his majority was just 10 votes.

After being defeated in Reading in the 1966 general election, Emery returned the following year by winning a by-election in Honiton. He represented that seat and its successor East Devon until stepping down at the 2001 general election. He was made a Privy Counsellor in 1993.

Emery spent most of his long political career as a backbencher, although he did serve as a junior minister under Edward Heath and, during his final term, served as treasurer of the powerful 1922 committee. Emery was a freemason.

References

External links 
 

1926 births
2004 deaths
Conservative Party (UK) MPs for English constituencies
Members of the Parliament of the United Kingdom for Reading
Councillors in Greater London
Members of the Privy Council of the United Kingdom
Alumni of Oriel College, Oxford
Members of the Bow Group
UK MPs 1959–1964
UK MPs 1964–1966
UK MPs 1966–1970
UK MPs 1970–1974
UK MPs 1974
UK MPs 1974–1979
UK MPs 1979–1983
UK MPs 1983–1987
UK MPs 1987–1992
UK MPs 1992–1997
UK MPs 1997–2001
Knights Bachelor
Politicians awarded knighthoods
School governors
Scotch Plains-Fanwood High School alumni
Freemasons of the United Grand Lodge of England
Members of the Parliament of the United Kingdom for Honiton
Members of the Parliament of the United Kingdom for East Devon
Royal Air Force personnel
Military personnel from London